The WABA Champions Cup 2008 was the 11th staging of the WABA Champions Cup, the basketball club tournament of West Asia Basketball Association. The tournament was held in Mahshahr, Iran between March 9 and March 15. The top three teams from different countries qualify for the FIBA Asia Champions Cup 2008.

Preliminary round

Group A

Group B

Final round

Quarterfinals

Semifinals 5th–8th

Semifinals

7th place

5th place

3rd place

Final

Final standing

External links
www.goalzz.com

2008
International basketball competitions hosted by Iran
2007–08 in Asian basketball
2007–08 in Jordanian basketball
2007–08 in Iranian basketball
2007–08 in Lebanese basketball
2008 in Syrian sport
2008 in Iraqi sport
2008 in Yemeni sport